The Europa Press was a publishing house founded and run by the Irish surrealist poet George Reavey. The press was based in Paris from its inception in 1932 until 1935, when Reavey moved to London. It ceased operation in 1939.

The Europa Press is important in the history of 20th century Irish poetry because it published early work by Reavey, Brian Coffey, Denis Devlin and Samuel Beckett and in a wider context of literary and surrealist history because it published the first ever collection of English-language versions of work by Paul Éluard. This was published to coincide with the opening of the International Surrealist Exhibition in 1936 and featured a drawing by Pablo Picasso and a preface by Herbert Read, and the translators included Reavey, Beckett, Devlin, David Gascoyne, Man Ray and Ruthven Todd.

Complete list of Europa Press books

Reavey, George. Faust's Metamorphoses. (1932) (in association with The New Review).
Reavey, George. Nostradam. (1935).
Reavey, George. Signes d'Adieu. (1935).
Beckett, Samuel. Echo's Bones and Other Precipitates. (1935).
Eluard, Paul. Thorns of Thunder. (1936).
Devlin, Denis. Intercessions. (1937).
Ford, Charles Henry. The Garden of Disorder. (1938)
Coffey, Brian. Third Person. (1938)
Reavey, George. Quixotic Perquisitions. (1939).

References
Print
Coughlan, P. and Davis, A. (eds) Modernism and Ireland: the Poetry of the 1930s. 

Online
An interview with George Reavey

Publishing companies established in 1932
Publishing companies disestablished in 1939
Small press publishing companies
Book publishing companies of France
Book publishing companies of the United Kingdom
Mass media in Paris
French companies established in 1932
1939 disestablishments in England
British companies disestablished in 1939